The Curtiss Twin JN (retrospectively called the Model 1B and also known as the JN-5) was an experimental aircraft built by the Curtiss Aeroplane and Motor Company for the United States Army Air Service.  It was a biplane, designed for observation missions.

Based on the successful Curtiss JN-4, the Twin JN used the same wing structure, but the wingspan was extended by enlarging the center section.  Lateral control was achieved with the tail of a Curtiss R-4. The Twin JN was powered by a pair of 90 hp (67 kW) Curtiss OXX-2 engines located between the wings.

One aircraft was evaluated by the United States Navy as a twin-float seaplane.

Operators

United States Army Air Service
United States Navy

Specifications

See also

References

 Bowers, Peter M. Curtiss Aircraft 1907–1947. London:Putnam, 1979. .
Donald, David, ed. Encyclopedia of World Aircraft. Etobicoke, ON: Prospero Books, 1997.
 John Andrade, U.S.Military Aircraft Designations and Serials since 1909, Midland Counties Publications, 1979, 

Twin JN, Curtiss
Twin JN
Biplanes
Aircraft first flown in 1916
Twin piston-engined tractor aircraft